Stephen Willis Stiles (July 16, 1943 – January 11, 2020) was an American cartoonist and writer, coming out of the science fiction fanzine tradition. He won the 2016 Hugo Award for Best Fan Artist.

Early life and education 
Steven Willis Stiles was born to Norma and Irvin Stiles. He had two brothers, Randy and Jeff.

Stiles studied at The High School of Music & Art and the School of Visual Arts in Manhattan and later wrote about this in his essay, "Art School":

Illustration and design

His first cartoon for a fanzine appeared in Cry of the Nameless, edited by F.M. Busby and Elinor Busby. A fanzine interlineation he coined ("Death is nature's way of telling you when to stop") became a national catchphrase after it was reprinted in Pageant in 1962. His work (art and text) has since appeared in leading fanzines (Xero, Void, Mimosa, Trap Door) as well as the more obscure (Vojo de Vivo). He publishes his own fanzine, SAM. There were nine years between SAM #14 and #15, the latter being published in 1983; and SAM #16 was published 31 years later, in 2014, in anticipation of the 2014 Corflu science fiction convention.

Professional work
His first professional sale was in 1961, which was a cartoon for Paul Krassner's The Realist.  After a stint in the military as an illustrator, he worked in advertising before becoming a freelancer in 1975. He worked in genres ranging from underground comix to children's books to superhero comics. He designed a Peace and Humanitarian Achievements medal for the Samaritan community in Israel. The medal's first recipient was Shimon Peres.

Awards
In 1968, Stiles was the Trans-Atlantic Fan Fund winner, attending Thirdmancon, the 1968 Eastercon in Buxton, Derbyshire. Harrison Country, a compilation of his writings and drawings about this trip, was published in 2007.

Stiles won eleven Fan Activity Achievement (FAAn) Awards for best artist (2001, 2003–2006, 2010–2012, 2014–2016). In 1998, Stiles won the first Bill Rotsler Award, named after prolific fan artist Bill Rotsler. He was a Hugo Award nominee as Best Fan Artist in 1967, 1968, 2003 through 2008, and 2010 through 2016, winning in 2016.

Personal life and demise 
Stiles was married to Elaine Stiles (née Mandell).

On January 7, 2020, Stiles announced his most recent cancer diagnosis on Facebook, "So, the word is: I've got a few months, more or less." He died on January 11, 2020, of the aforementioned cancer.

References

External links
Official website
1998 Rotsler Award: Steve Stiles at scifiinc.org
Lambiek Comiclopedia article

1943 births
2020 deaths

American cartoonists
American comics artists
Role-playing game artists
Underground cartoonists
The High School of Music & Art alumni
School of Visual Arts alumni